Tom is mostly used as a diminutive of Thomas. In Germanic countries and Scandinavia, "Tom" is in use as a formal given name.
In modern Hebrew, the name Tom (Hebrew: תם, תום) is used as a unisex name, with the meaning of "innocence, naivety, simplicity" or "the end.”

The name Tôm also exists as an independent Aramaic name.

Disambiguation pages 
 Tom Anderson (disambiguation)
 Tom Arnold, a disambiguation page
 Tom Baker (disambiguation)
 Thomas Bell (disambiguation)
 Tom Cochran, a disambiguation page
 Tom Cotter (disambiguation)
 Tom Daly (disambiguation)
 Tom Fletcher (disambiguation)
 Tom Holland (disambiguation)
 Tom Kennedy (disambiguation)
 Tom Kenny (disambiguation)
 Tom Murphy (disambiguation)
 Tom Parker (disambiguation)
 Tom Simpson (disambiguation)

Sportsmen 
 Tom (footballer, born 1985), Brazilian footballer
 Tom (footballer, born 1986), Brazilian footballer
 Tom (footballer, born 1988), Brazilian footballer
 Tom (footballer, born 1991), Brazilian footballer
 Tom Aspinall (born 1993), English professional mixed martial artist
 Tom Brady, American football player best known for playing with the New England Patriots
 Tom Brandi (born 1966), American professional wrestler
 Tom Browning (1960–2022), American professional baseball pitcher
 Tom Cutler, Australian rules footballer
 Tom Daley, English diver
 Tom Drake (wrestler) (1930–2017), American professional wrestler
 Tom Dwan, American poker player
 Tom Kingston (rugby league), Australian rugby league player
 Tom Gamboa, American baseball coach and manager
 Tom Gilson (American football), American football 
 Tom Gordon (born 1967), American former professional baseball right-handed pitcher and current radio color commentator
 Tom Hardy (soccer), American soccer defender
 Tom Hoover (basketball) (born 1941), American former professional basketball player
 Tom Humble, Australian Rugby League player
 Tom Jenkins (baseball) (1898–1979), American baseball player
 Tom Jenkins (golfer) (born 1947), American golfer
 Tom Jenkins (wrestler) (1872–1957), American professional wrestler
 Tom Kingston (rugby union), Australian rugby union player
 Tom Leppard (1936–2016), English soldier best known as the most tattooed senior citizen
 Tom Magee (born 1958), Canadian powerlifter and pro wrestler
 Tom Maayan (born 1993), Israeli basketball player in the Israeli National League
 Tom Mees, American sports broadcaster
 Tom Murphy (catcher) (born 1991), American baseball player
 Tom Okker (born 1944), Dutch tennis player
 Tom Peck, American Racing driver
 Tom Pratt (American football), American football coach
 Tom Prichard (born 1959), American retired professional wrestler
 Tom Rehder, American football player
 Tom Rockliff, Australian rules footballer
 Tom Stolhandske, American football player
 Tom Stone, American retired professional wrestler 
 Tom Symonds, Australian Rugby League player
 Tom Tavares, Cape Verdean footballer
 Tom Vu, Vietnamese American poker player, real estate investor and speaker
 Tom Watson (fighter) (born 1982), English mixed martial artist 
 Tom Yaacobov (born 1992), Israeli triple jumper
 Tom Zenk (1958–2017), American professional wrestler and bodybuilder

Politicians 

 Oswald 'Tom' Mosley, English politician, known principally as the founder of the British Union of Fascists
 Tom Cotton, American politician
 Tom DeLay, American politician
 Tom van den Nieuwenhuijzen, Dutch politician
 Tom Veen, Dutch politician
 Tom Wolf, American politician

Personalities 

 Tom Bergeron, American television personality and game show host
 Tom Holkenborg, Dutch DJ previously known as Junkie XL
 Tom Scott (presenter), British YouTuber
 Tom Westman, American firefighter and television personality

Actors 
 Tom Adams (actor), English actor
 Tom Bosley, American actor
 Tom Cassell, British Youtuber
 Tom Cruise, American actor
 Tom Ellis (actor), Welsh actor best known for playing Lucifer Morningstar on Lucifer
 Tom Felton, English actor and singer
 Tom Hanks, American film actor
 Tom Hardy, English actor
 Tom Hiddleston, English actor
 Tom Holland, English actor
 Tom Gilson, American actor
 Tom Glynn-Carney, English actor
 Tom Green, Canadian actor and comedian
 Tom Hopper, English actor
 Tom Jordan, Irish actor
 Tom Kane, American voice actor
 Tom Lister (born 1978), English actor
 Tom Maden, American actor
 Tom Mix, American cowboy actor
 Tom Poston, American actor
 Tom Selleck, American actor and film producer
 Tom Sizemore (1961–2023), American actor
 Tom Sturridge, English actor best known for playing Dream (character) on The Sandman (TV series)
 Tom Welling, American actor best known for playing Clark Kent on Smallville

Musicians 
 Tom Araya, American bassist and vocalist with Slayer
 Tom Chaplin, British singer of Keane
 Stompin' Tom Connors, Canadian singer/songwriter
 Tom DeLonge (born 1975), American musician (blink-182)
 Tom Evans (musician) (1947–1983), English musician and songwriter (Badfinger)
 Tom Dowd, American sound engineer and producer for Atlantic Records
 Tom Fogerty (1941–1990), American guitarist for Creedence Clearwater Revival
 Tom Fowler, American bassist for Frank Zappa, The Mothers of Invention, It's a Beautiful Day, among others
 Tom Hamilton, American bassist (Aerosmith)
 Tom Jobim, Brazilian singer-songwriter
 Tom Jones (singer), Welsh singer
 Tom Kaulitz, guitarist of Tokio Hotel
 Tom Morello, American guitarist (Rage Against the Machine and Audioslave)
 Tom Petersson, American bassist (Cheap Trick)
 Tom Petty (1950–2017), American singer-songwriter and musician
 Tom Smothers, American comedian, composer, and musician (Smothers Brothers)
 Tom Verlaine, American guitarist for the punk band Television
 Tom Waits, American singer-songwriter, composer, and actor
 Tom Zé, Brazilian singer‐songwriter

Artists 
 Tom Luckey (1940–2012), American architect and sculptor
 Tomm Moore, Irish illustrator, comics artist and filmmaker
 Tom Palumbo, Italian born, American photographer
 Tom Tsuchiya, American sculptor

Other 
 Tom Brokaw, American anchor for NBC
 Tom Clancy, American author
 Tom Foster, British Father and master vaccinator
 Tom Konyves, Canadian poet, pioneer of video poetry
 Tom Hagen, Norwegian businessman
 Tom McGillis, Canadian producer
 Tom McLaury, Wild West gunfighter
 Tom Moore, known as Captain Tom, a British Army officer
 Tom Mylan, American butcher, author, writer
 Tom O'Carroll, British paedophilia advocate
 Tom Ruegger, American animator and screenwriter
 Tom Segev, Israeli historian, author, and journalist
 Tom Stone (magician), Swedish magician, editor and author
 Tom Tykwer, German film director

Fictional characters 
 Tom Bombadil, a character from The Lord of the Rings and The Adventures of Tom Bombadil
 Tom Cat, a title character from Tom and Jerry
 Tom Thumb, character of English folklore
 Tom Riddle, Harry Potter series villain
 Talking Tom, A black cat and the main Character of the Talking Tom & Friends franchise
 Tom Sawyer

See also

Tó, nicknames
Ton (given name)
Tommy (disambiguation)
Thomas (name)
Tomas (disambiguation)

English-language masculine given names
English masculine given names
Dutch masculine given names